Joseph  "Joe" Dodd is an English former professional darts player who has competed members in the 1980s, reaching a highest world ranking of number 8.

Career 
Dodd started playing darts at age 23. Towards the end of the 1970s, he had begun to forge a strong reputation on the county scene and in open tournaments. He represented both Buckinghamshire and Oxfordshire at county level, where he went by the nickname of The Bulldog.

The biggest win of Dodd's career came in 1982 when he won the prestigious Embassy LV tournament, beating Brian Langworth in the final.

He competed at the 1982 BDO World Darts Championship and defeated Tim Brown 2–1 in the first round, but was defeated in the second round 0–2 by John Lowe.

Dodd also enjoyed great success in the playing for Tottenham in the London superleague, at the time probably the strongest in the country. In 1983, he enjoyed a profitable evening, winning the singles, pairs (with Dave Whitcombe) and the mixed pairs (with Sharon Kemp) on the same night.

Joe made 11 appearances for England, winning 8 matches. He made his debut at the Sunderland Empire Theatre against Scotland, beating Jocky Wilson 3–2 for his first win.

World Championship results

BDO
 1982: 2nd round: (lost to John Lowe 0–2) (sets)

External links
Profile and stats on Darts Database

1946 births
English darts players
Living people
British Darts Organisation players
20th-century English people